Émile Beaussire (26 May 1824, Luçon – 28 May 1889) was a French republican politician and a philosopher. He was a member of the National Assembly from 1871 to 1876 and of the Chamber of Deputies from 1876 to 1877 and from 1879 to 1881. He belonged to the Centre gauche parliamentary group.

References

1824 births
1889 deaths
People from Luçon
Politicians from Pays de la Loire
French republicans
Members of the National Assembly (1871)
Members of the 1st Chamber of Deputies of the French Third Republic
Members of the 2nd Chamber of Deputies of the French Third Republic
19th-century French philosophers
French male non-fiction writers